The Fuji Fishing Port is a fishing port in Shimen District, New Taipei, Taiwan.

History
The port used to be a small unknown fishing port in the region. In 1995, the Fuji Fish Outlet Center was established by Jinshan Fishermen's Association within the area. After the local government established the Fuji Seafood Market, the port became well known to the public.

Architecture
The port have 3.5-meter deep wharf and 1.9 hectares berth and 3.0-meter deep wharf and 0.95 hectares berth. The port also features a fish market.

Transportation
The port is accessible by bus from Tamsui Station of Taipei Metro.

References

Ports and harbors of New Taipei